William Raymond Tancred (born 6 August 1942) is a leading sports administrator, academic and former international athlete. He competed at the 1968 and 1972 Summer Olympics in the discus and won a bronze and silver medals in successive Commonwealth Games from 1970 to 1974. He was the British National discus champion on seven occasions and held the British record for 25 years his personal best being 64.94m in 1974. He also competed in the shot put and remains one of the top ten British shot putters. Athleticsweekly.com has ranked Tancred as the greatest British discus thrower of all-time by virtue of his long reign as British record-holder and profusion of AAA titles.

Early life
Bill Tancred was born in Quetta, Balochistan, Pakistan, and grew up in Felixstowe. He was one of a number of siblings, one of his younger brothers being the athlete and strongman Pete Tancred. As a school boy, the javelin was his main event but he developed elbow trouble and was forced to abandon this event. His father, Adrian, believed that this was not a barrier to athletics in another discipline and Bill took up the discus in which his father coached him. After the family moved to Ipswich from Felixstowe he would find roads with adjoining fields to throw into and would often lose the discus in long grass. His father would get him to read books on the subject as well, to hone the technique, a discipline not used widely in the 1950s. His father would also improvise with equipment if none were available. He joined Ipswich Harriers and trained at the Ipswich Town training ground. This gave him opportunities for competition within the county and also in the Eastern Counties framework.

Sport
Having represented his county, he competed in the Eastern Counties and rose quickly to domestic prominence.  His first international vest for Great Britain was in 1964 against the Benelux Countries in Ghent. Although proud of his British and European and Commonwealth achievements, Tancred has made it clear that the pinnacle of being an athlete is to compete at the Olympic games, and in interviews recalls getting a letter signed by the Duke of Edinburgh, telling him that he had been selected to represent Great Britain in the 1968 Olympics. He took his father, mother, friends and siblings for a meal to celebrate. As a young athlete, he recalls being awestruck at the Olympics. He saw Bob Beamon set the long jump record, recalled talking to athletes about a new high jump method called the Fosbury flop, witnessed the Black power salute of the American sprinters and found himself competing against his idol, Al Oerter, already the three time Olympic discus champion who won his fourth gold medal in Mexico, which he reportedly said was one for each of his daughters. Of his own performance, Tancred has said that he felt he ought to have thrown better but a combination of over training and lack of experience in such a big arena as the Olympics were his downfall. The discipline of waiting long periods between throws was something he had not appreciated and found hard to reconcile to a more explosive approach that he employed.

One of the nineteen occasions that he broke the British record was at the AAA championships in 1972 where he received a tracksuit, sponsored by Nationwide as a prize. However, he was not permitted not wear the tracksuit at AAA events due to the rules around sponsorship. On one occasion, whilst wearing Adidas shoes he broke the British record, and so pleased were the promoters of Adidas that one said, "I’m going to give you some money for this because you’ve earned it. I’m going to put £20 in your pocket". He recalls this, tongue-in-cheek, as his first professional pay.

In total, Tancred represented Great Britain a 55 times. He competed at the 1968 and 1972 Summer Olympics in the discus, as well as at three Commonwealth Games in 1966, 1970, (where he achieved the bronze medal) and 1974 (where he achieved the silver medal). He also competed at the 1966, 1969 and 1971 European Championships. Domestically, he set the British discus record on nineteen occasions. He was seven times the British Champion having won the AAA discus title from 1966 to 1970 and 1972–1973. His mark of 64.94m in 1974, set in Loughborough on 21 July 1974, was his personal best but his British record was set after this in Woodford on 10 August 1974 at 64.32m. This remained the best thrown by a British athlete until Richard Slaney bettered it on 1 July 1985, in Eugene, Oregon, United States, although unofficially. Robert Weir officially broke the record in 1997. Tancred remains sixth on the British all-time list for the discus. He also competed in the shot and remains one of the top ten British shot putters. He won the British National Indoor (AAA) Championships for the shot in 1969 and 1976. Interestingly, he came 3rd in the AAA junior championships for the javelin in 1960.(5)

Life outside of sport
Tancred also served in the Army, first with the 1st East Anglian Regiment and then with the Army Physical Training Corps. After his military service, he attended Loughborough College for teacher training, and then went on to Loughborough University, renowned for its sporting reputation, for a master's degree in human biology. He then obtained another master's degree by research, in physical education. Continuing his education he received a N.A.T.O. Fellowship to study for a doctorate in sports management in the United States.

As an academic he has taught and lectured in schools, colleges, polytechnics and universities, and among his many positions was for a long time the Director of Physical Education and Sport at Sheffield University as well as the Professor of Sports Studies at Buckinghamshire Chilterns University College. He is also a published author, having written a number of books as well numerous articles and has presented papers at conferences in subjects relating to human sports performance, health related fitness and coaching. In November 2016 he published an autobiography.

After his retirement from competition, Tancred remained actively involved in sport and served on several committees, including being Chairman of the International Athletes Club and President of Sheffield University's World Student Games Directorate. He later became the National event coach to the British Amateur Athletics Board (BAAB) and also coach of UK Athletics and the International Association of Athletics Federations (IAAF). In 2007 he joined the board of the British Olympic Association. He has been active in pushing forward proposals to encourage greater participation in schools.

Professor Tancred is also the Chairman of the Suffolk Sport Board. Having been resident in Sheffield for 25 years, he moved back to Felixstowe in 2014.

Honours
In 1992 Bill Tancred was awarded an MBE for services to athletics. In 2007 Bill Tancred was inducted into the Hall of Fame at West Virginia University, USA, by the College of Physical Activity and Sports Science.  In 2008 Bill Tancred was awarded an Honorary Doctorate by the University of Suffolk (Honorary Graduates and Fellows of the University).

References

1942 births
Living people
Members of the Order of the British Empire
Athletes (track and field) at the 1968 Summer Olympics
Athletes (track and field) at the 1972 Summer Olympics
People from Quetta
English male discus throwers
English male shot putters
Commonwealth Games medallists in athletics
Athletes (track and field) at the 1966 British Empire and Commonwealth Games
Athletes (track and field) at the 1970 British Commonwealth Games
Athletes (track and field) at the 1974 British Commonwealth Games
Athletics (track and field) administrators
Academics of the University of Sheffield
Commonwealth Games silver medallists for England
Commonwealth Games bronze medallists for England
Olympic athletes of Great Britain
Royal Anglian Regiment soldiers
Royal Army Physical Training Corps soldiers
20th-century British Army personnel
Medallists at the 1970 British Commonwealth Games
Medallists at the 1974 British Commonwealth Games